Statue Junction is a central location in Thiruvananthapuram, India. The Secretariat of the Indian state of Kerala is located at Statue Junction, which was where the old legislative assembly of the region used to take place. The Secretariat now holds offices for most of the Government officials.Print Arts located at statue. One of the best Printing and designing shop in Trivandrum 

Road junctions in India